The  ("People's Hall"), also called  ("Great Hall") or  ("Hall of Glory"), was a proposal for a monumental, domed  building to be built in a reconstituted Berlin (renamed as Germania) in Nazi Germany. The project was conceived by Adolf Hitler and designed by his architect Albert Speer. No part of the building was ever constructed.

The word Volk had a particular resonance in Nazi thinking. The term völkisch movement, which can be translated to English as "the people's movement" or "the folkish movement", derives from  but also implies a particularly racial undertone. Before the First World War, völkisch thought had developed an attitude to the arts as the German ; that is, from an organically linked Aryan or Nordic community, racially unpolluted and with its roots in the German soil of the Heimat (homeland).

Hitler and Hadrian's Pantheon

Just as Augustus's Domus on the Palatine was connected to the Temple of Apollo Palatinus, so Hitler's palace was to have been connected by a cryptoporticus to the Volkshalle, which filled the entire north side of the forum. This truly enormous building was, according to Albert Speer, inspired by Hadrian's Pantheon, which Hitler visited privately on May 7, 1938. But Hitler's interest in and admiration for the Pantheon predated this visit, since his sketch of the Volkshalle dates from about 1925. Hermann Giesler records a conversation he had with Hitler in the winter of 1939–40, when Hitler was recalling his “Roman Impressions”:

Hitler's impressions of the Roman Pantheon were revived when on June 24, 1940, he made a tour of selected buildings in Paris, with the German architects Albert Speer and Hermann Giesler and sculptor Arno Breker, including the Paris Panthéon, which seems to have disappointed him, independently recorded by Giesler and Breker.

The sketch of the Volkshalle given by Hitler to Speer shows a traditional gabled pronaos supported by ten columns, a shallow rectangular intermediate block and behind it the domed main building. Giesler notes that the pronaos of the temple in Hitler's sketch is reminiscent of Hadrian's Pantheon and of the style of Friedrich Gilly or Karl Friedrich Schinkel. However, there was little about Speer's elaboration of the sketch that might be termed Doric, except perhaps for the triglyphs in the entablature, supported by the geminated red granite columns with their Egyptian palm-leaf capitals, previously employed by Speer in the portico outside Hitler's study on the garden side of the new Chancellery.

Speer's Monster-Building was to be the capital's most important and impressive building in terms of its size and symbolism. Visually it was to have been the architectural centrepiece of Berlin as the world capital (Welthauptstadt). Its dimensions were so large that it would have dwarfed every other structure in Berlin, including those on the north-south axis itself. The oculus of the building's dome,  in diameter, would have accommodated the entire rotunda of Hadrian's Pantheon and the dome of St. Peter's Basilica. The diameter of the dome, was to be exceeded, much to Speer's annoyance, by the diameter of Giesler's new domed railway station at the east end of Munich's east-west axis. It was to be  greater in diameter than Speer's Volkshalle.

The resemblance of the Volkshalle to the Pantheon is far more obvious when their interiors are compared.

The three concentric tiers of seats enclosing a circular arena  in diameter owe nothing to the Pantheon but resemble the seating arrangements in Ludwig Ruff's Congress Hall at Nuremberg, which was modeled on the Colosseum. Other features of the Volkshalle's interior are clearly indebted to Hadrian's Pantheon: the coffered dome, the pillared zone, which here is continuous, except where it flanks the huge niche on the north side. The second zone in the Pantheon, consisting of blind windows with intervening pilasters, is represented in Speer's building by a zone above the pillars consisting of uniform, oblong shallow recesses. The coffered dome rests on this zone. The design and size of the external decoration of this Volkshalle, are all exceptional and call for explanations that do not apply to community halls planned for Nazi fora in other German cities.

The temple-like nature of the domed building was noted by Speer, who surmised that the building was ultimately intended for public worship of Hitler, his successors and the German Reich, that is, it was to be a dynastic temple/palace complex of the kind Augustus built on the Palatine, where his modest house was connected to the temple of Apollo.

Hitler's aspirations to hegemony over Europe and the establishment of the New Order, already evident from architectural and decorative features of the new Chancellery, are even more clearly expressed here. External symbols suggest that the domed hall was where Hitler as cosmocrat would appear before his Herrenvolk: On top of the dome's lantern was the German heraldic eagle clutching the globe of the Earth. This symbolism was well known in imperial Roman iconography, for example, the restored statue of Claudius holding a ball and eagle in his right hand. The vast dome, on which it rested, as with Hadrian's Pantheon, symbolically represented the vault of the sky spanning Germany's empire. The globe on the dome's lantern was enhanced and emphasized by two monumental sculptures by Breker, each 15 metres high, which flanked the north façade of the building: at its west end Atlas supporting the heavens, at its east end Tellus supporting the Earth. Both mythological figures were chosen by Hitler himself. Giesler says that Speer was wrong to represent the Volkshalle as a symbol of World Domination. Speer in his Playboy magazine interview states:

Nevertheless, Giesler remarked that Hitler never made plans for world domination and that to suggest as much is not only nonsense but 'Speer Rubbish'.

In fiction
Robert Harris's 1992 novel Fatherland takes place in an alternate history in which Nazi Germany won World War II and in which the Volkshalle was actually built. Several of the book's scenes take place in and around it. Harris carefully used Speer's plans, with the building being depicted as being 300 m (1,000 ft) high. As depicted in the book, the building would indeed have had its own "weather", with the breathing and perspiration of 150,000 occupants precipitating in the high dome; but rather than considering this a problem, Nazi propaganda would boast of it. In a real-world corollary to the fiction concerning the Volkshalle, morning fog can roll into the Kennedy Space Center's immense Vehicle Assembly Building, leading to "clouds" being observed inside the building.

The Volkshalle appears in the alternate history novel In the Presence of Mine Enemies by Harry Turtledove, being used for the lying in state for the deceased Führer, Kurt Haldweim.

The Volkshalle's image appears in the video game Wolfenstein: The New Order, in an alternate 1960s in which (like the Fatherland novel) Nazi Germany won World War II.

Computer-generated imagery is used to depict the Volkshalle in an alternate history Berlin in the TV production of The Man in the High Castle. Multiple scenes in seasons two to four take place inside various parts of the Volkshalle. Unlike most other depictions of the Volkshalle, it was shown to have housed the Führer's Office and residence.

In the final scene of the video work Malka Germania by Yael Bartana, a computer generated model of the Volkshalle emerges from Lake Wannsee.

See also
Nazi architecture
Palace of the Soviets
Reichstag building
Symbolism of domes

References

Further reading

External links 

Nazi architecture
20th century in Berlin
Buildings and structures in Berlin
Unbuilt buildings and structures in Germany
Albert Speer buildings
Adolf Hitler
Proposed monuments and memorials